The 1981 Merdeka Tournament was held from 30 August to 20 September 1981 in Malaysia.

Group stage

Group A

Group B

Knockout stage

Semifinals

Final

References

Merdeka Cup